The City Youth League, later known as the African Youth League, is a defunct organization that participated in nonviolent resistance against the government in Rhodesia from its founding in August 1955 until it merged with the old SRANC on September 12, 1957, becoming the new Southern Rhodesia African National Congress.

The CYL was founded by James Chikerema, Dunduzu Chisiza, George Nyandoro, and Edson Sithole.

Chikerema served as President and Nyandoro as Vice President.

See also
African National Congress Youth League
Rhodesian Bush War

References

Defunct political parties in Zimbabwe
National liberation movements in Africa
Political parties in Rhodesia